The B-Sides is a compilation album by American rock band the Gaslight Anthem, released on January 28, 2014, on SideOneDummy Records. The album compiles various b-sides and outtakes, many in acoustic form, from the band's singles from 2008 and 2011.

Track listing

Personnel
Band
 Brian Fallon—lead vocals, guitar
 Alex Rosamilia—guitar, backing vocals
 Alex Levine—bass guitar, backing vocals
 Benny Horowitz—drums

Chart performance

References

The Gaslight Anthem albums
2014 compilation albums
B-side compilation albums
SideOneDummy Records albums